Ladentown United Methodist Church is a historic United Methodist church on Ladentown Road in the Village of Pomona, Rockland County, New York.  It was built about 1865 and is a rectangular one story, traditional timber-frame structure above a raised basement.  It features a steeply pitched gable roof and an engaged central tower.

It was listed on the National Register of Historic Places in 2005.

References

United Methodist churches in New York (state)
Churches on the National Register of Historic Places in New York (state)
Italianate architecture in New York (state)
Churches in Rockland County, New York
National Register of Historic Places in Rockland County, New York
Italianate church buildings in the United States